Jackson Springs is an unincorporated community and census-designated place (CDP) in Moore County, North Carolina, United States. It was first listed as a CDP in the 2020 census with a population of 154.

In the early 1900s Jackson Springs was a bustling community, complete with a grand hotel, drugstore, train depot, bowling alley, and various other businesses. The town had become famous for its flowing springs of mineral water which many believed had therapeutic qualities. "Cures dyspepsia and other stomach troubles; diseases of the kidney, and rheumatism." The springs helped give the town notoriety as a health resort.

Notable people
North Carolina State Senator Harris Blake was born in Jackson Springs.
Sean Pollard, center for the Baltimore Ravens

Demographics

2020 census

Note: the US Census treats Hispanic/Latino as an ethnic category. This table excludes Latinos from the racial categories and assigns them to a separate category. Hispanics/Latinos can be of any race.

References
General

Specific
 Sarah Ruth Currie Thompson, "Coming Home To Jackson Springs, North Carolina."

Unincorporated communities in Moore County, North Carolina
Unincorporated communities in North Carolina
Census-designated places in Moore County, North Carolina
Census-designated places in North Carolina